Embryonics is a double-CD compilation of tracks by the Australian progressive metal band, Alchemist. It was released in 2005 in Australia by Chatterbox Records and worldwide by Relapse Records. The album features 28 tracks recorded by the band between 1990 and 1998 including eight songs from the album Jar of Kingdom, eight from Lunasphere and five from Spiritech along with a cover of "Eve of the War" from Jeff Wayne's Musical Version of The War of the Worlds that was the title track from EP Eve of the War that is now deleted. The live version of "Chinese Whispers" is also from that EP; the other live tracks were recorded in 1995 at the studios of Triple J for an episode of Three Hours of Power and are exclusive to this release. "Paisley Bieurr" and "Imagination Flower" are early demo tracks.

Track listing
(all songs written by Alchemist except #1, CD 2 by Jeff Wayne)

CD 1

CD 2

Credits

Band members
 Adam Agius − vocals, guitar, keyboards
 Rodney Holder − drums
 John Bray − bass guitar (except #12, disc 1)
 Roy Torkington − guitar (except #12, disc 1 and #5, disc 2), artwork, layout and design
 James Preece − bass (#12, disc 1)
 Andrew Meredith − guitar (#12, disc 1 and #5, disc 2)

Guest musicians
 Michelle Klemke − vocals (#9, disc 1 and #9, disc 2)
 Josh Nixon − guitar (#1, disc 2)

2005 compilation albums
Alchemist (band) albums
Progressive metal compilation albums
Relapse Records compilation albums